The Summit Road Tree is a giant sequoia located in the Mountain Home Grove, one of several sequoia groves found in the southern Sierra Nevada of California. It is the 16th largest giant sequoia in the world, and could be considered the 15th largest depending on how badly Ishi Giant atrophied during the Rough Fire in 2015.

History
The Summit Road Tree, also known as the Summit Tree, was named and measured in 1988 by "big tree hunter" Wendell Flint, with the help of friends Mike Law and Jerry Latham. Flint later determined that it was by volume the 16th largest tree in the world. However, the number two tree, the Washington Tree, lost its ranking in 2003 due to damage from a lightning strike, and the Summit Road Tree is now considered the 16th largest.

Dimensions
The dimensions of the Summit Road Tree as measured by Flint, Law and Latham are shown below. The calculated volume ignores burns.

See also
 List of largest giant sequoias
 List of individual trees
 Mountain Home Grove

References

Further reading
 

Individual giant sequoia trees
Natural history of Tulare County, California
Sequoia National Forest